Kenmore is a station stop on the RTA Blue Line in Shaker Heights, Ohio, located at the intersection of Kenmore Road, Glencairn Road, Ingleside Road and Van Aken Boulevard.

History
The station opened on April 11, 1920, with the initiation of rail service by the Cleveland Interurban Railroad on what is now Van Aken Boulevard from Lynnfield Road to Shaker Square and then to East 34th Street and via surface streets to downtown.

In 1980 and 1981, the Green and Blue Lines were completely renovated with new track, ballast, poles and wiring, and new stations were built along the line. The renovated line along Van Aken Boulevard opened on October 30, 1981.

Station layout

The station comprises two side platforms, the westbound platform east of the intersection, and the eastbound platform west of the intersection, with a small shelter on each platform. Diagonal parking is provided on both sides of Van Aken Boulevard adjacent to the westbound platform.

References

External links

Blue Line (RTA Rapid Transit)
Railway stations in the United States opened in 1920
1920 establishments in Ohio